Squash was contested from December 8 to December 12 at the 1998 Asian Games in Ambassador City Jomtien, Pattaya, Thailand. Competition consists of men's and women's singles competition.

Zarak Jahan Khan of Pakistan won the men's gold medal while Nicol David of Malaysia won the women's competition.

Schedule

Medalists

Medal table

Participating nations
A total of 33 athletes from 12 nations competed in squash at the 1998 Asian Games:

References

worldsquash.org

External links
Results
Results

 
1998 Asian Games events
1998
Asian Games
1998 Asian Games